Velupillai or Veluppillai is a Tamil male given name. Due to the Tamil tradition of using patronymic surnames it may also be a surname for males and females.

Notable people

Given name
 A. Veluppillai (1936–2015), Sri Lankan historian and academic
 Vela Velupillai (born 1947), Sri Lankan economist

Surname
 C. Velupillai Kandaiah Sivagnanam, Sri Lankan civil servant and politician
 Kanthapillai Velupillai Nadarajah (1905–2000), Ceylonese lawyer and politician
 Samuel James Veluppillai Chelvanayakam (1898–1977), Ceylonese lawyer and politician
 Velupillai Ambalavanar Kandiah (1891–1963), Ceylonese lawyer and politician
 Velupillai Appapillai (1913–2001), Sri Lankan physicist and academic
 Velupillai Coomaraswamy (1892–?), Ceylonese civil servant and diplomat
 Velupillai Kumaraswamy (1919–?), Ceylonese lawyer and politician
 Velupillai Prabhakaran (1954–2009), Sri Lankan rebel
 Velupillai Suppiah Thurairajah (1927–2011), Sri Lankan architect

See also
 
 

Tamil masculine given names